The 1928 Ladies Open Championships was held at the Queen's Club, West Kensington in London from 24–29 January 1928. Joyce Cave won her third title defeating Cecily Fenwick in the final. The championship was switched to a straight knockout format replacing the group format previously used. Joyce Cave returned after missing the two previous tournaments but Nancy Cave could not compete due to illness. Joyce Cave was still unable to compete due to a wrist injury.

Draw and results

Notes
1 Mrs Winifred Kittermaster (née Miss Winifred Rotherham)

References

Women's British Open Squash Championships
Women's British Open Squash Championships
Women's British Open Squash Championships
Squash competitions in London
British Open Championships
Women's British Open Squash Championships